Nikolai Alekseyevich Kuznetsov (19 December 1922 —12 August 2009) was a Soviet, and later, Kazakhstani aviator. Kuznetsov served in the Soviet Armed Forces during World War II, and later went on to serve as the director of the Kazakh SSR's Administration of Civil Aviation. Kuznetsov has been called the "father of Kazakhstani aviation".

Early life
Nikolai Kuznetsov was born in the village of Novokarpovka, in the Nura District of the Karaganda region of the Kazakh Soviet Socialist Republic.

World War II

Upon the outbreak of Operation Barbarossa, Kuznetsov served in the Red Army. He graduated from military school as a pilot in 1942. After being chosen to receive further training in 1943, Kuznetsov began working as a pilot instructor for the Red Army. During this period, Kuznetsov also participated in a number of tasks and battles, such as an operation in the city of Magnitogorsk to eliminate Otto Skorzeny, and his division of Hitler's army. Skorzeny's plan was to destroy a steel factory, which produced ammunition for the Red Army. Soviet forces were able to neutralize Skorzeny's attempt, though Skorzeny himself managed to escape.

Post-war career

After completion of his military service in 1947, he became a pilot in the Akmola airport in Kazakh Soviet Socialist Republic. A year later he was promoted to the director of the airport.

 

During his tenure, the Civil Aviation of Kazakhstan won acclaim for being equipped with advanced aviation technology and better disciplined personnel than other Soviet counterparts.

Later life

In 1989, Nikolai Kuznetsov, along with Vladimir Kouropatenko, founded Sayakhat Airlines, the first private airline in the Kazakh SSR. The airline commenced operations on June 30, 1991.

Personal life

 She graduated from the Medical Institute of Baku with a medical degree. Antonina worked in Akmola as a physician, and met Nikolai after he flew there in 1949. She continued her medical studies in Alma-Ata where she became an OB/GYN doctor.

Nikolai and Kuznetsov settled in Alma-Ata in the early 1950s. Here they raised their two daughters, a grandson and two granddaughters.

Awards

 Twice Hero of Socialist Labour
 Two Orders of Lenin
 Order of the Red Banner of Labour
 Medal "Veteran of Labour"

A bronze monument in his homeland by the Presidium of the Supreme Soviet. In the 1980s Kuznetsov was awarded the Council of Ministers of the Soviet Union, and he was elected as a deputy of the Supreme Soviet of the Kazakh Soviet Socialist Republic.

Books
"Helm and Course" - an autobiography with contributions from more than 300 people, such as Dinmukhamed Kunaev, Leonid Brezhnev, Mikhail Gorbachev, and Boris Bugayev, among others.

References

1922 births
2009 deaths
People from Karaganda Region
Al-Farabi Kazakh National University alumni
Heroes of Socialist Labour
Recipients of the Order of Lenin
Recipients of the Order of the Red Banner of Labour
Soviet aviators
Soviet World War II flying aces